Ferrell is an English surname of Irish origin.

Ferrell may also refer to:
Ferrell, New Jersey
Ferrell, West Virginia
Ferrell Center, an arena in Waco, Texas
Ferrellgas, an American supplier of propane based in Kansas and Missouri

See also
Ferrel (disambiguation)